Sir Warin FitzGerold, also known as Sir Warin FitzGerald the Younger c.1167 – c.1218.

Biography 
Sir Warin was born in the reign of King Henry II, his father Henry fitzGerold was Chamberlain to the King. Sir Warin served the next monarch, King Richard I, as a Knight on the Third Crusade. He subsequently served King John as Chamberlain of the Exchequer.

The itinerary for King Richard I - 8 June 1191 reveals that Warin FitzGerald was at the Siege of Acre, one of the bloodiest parts of the Third Crusade. Whilst hunting with the King, the party was attacked by some forces of Saladin, he and some other knights helped save the life of the King.

Warin married Alice de Courcy, daughter of William de Courcy. With this marriage he inherited Stogursey Castle near Bridgwater in Somerset, England. Alice's mother was Juliana, daughter of Richer D'Aquila, 2nd Baron of Pevensey Castle in Sussex. The male line of Aquila family ceased with the death of Gilbert the 4th Baron in 1231. The coat of Arms of three spreadeagles, bearings of Aquila, passed to Warin II, as husband of Alice. King John visited his Chamberlain at Stogursey in 1210.

Warin also held the manor at Seaforth in Sussex. There had been a port at Seaforth since Roman times, more importantly it is near the River Ouse, which was used to carry goods right up to the county town of Lees.

He died in 1218.

References

External links 
 Sir Warin FitzGerold on geni.com

Anglo-Normans
Norman warriors
1160s births
1218 deaths
Feudal barons of Stoke Courcy
Burials at Reading Abbey